Mahaplag (IPA: [mɐ'hɐplɐg]), officially the Municipality of Mahaplag;, is a 4th class municipality in the province of Leyte, Philippines. According to the 2020 census, it has a population of 27,865 people.

Geography

Barangays
Mahaplag is politically subdivided into 28 barangays.

Climate

Demographics

Economy

References

External links
 [ Philippine Standard Geographic Code]
Philippine Census Information
Local Governance Performance Management System

Municipalities of Leyte (province)